"Drinkin' Songs" is a song recorded by Canadian country artist MacKenzie Porter. The song was co-written by Griffen Palmer and Lucas Nord. It was the fourth single from her extended play Drinkin' Songs: The Collection.

Critical reception
Erica Zisman of NY Country Swag called the song a "heartbreak anthem" as well as "heart-achingly beautiful and relatable". The Country Note referred to the track as "upbeat" and "a celebration of getting over him".

Music video
The official music video for "Drinkin' Songs" premiered on February 5, 2021. It was directed by Justin Clough and filmed in Nashville, Tennessee. The video features Porter chronologically moving through the decades, having a different, inconsiderate male beau each time.

Commercial performance
"Drinkin' Songs" reached a peak of #5 on the Billboard Canada Country chart dated March 13, 2021.  It also peaked at #74 on the Canadian Hot 100 for the same week. The song has been certified Gold by Music Canada.

Charts

Certifications

References

2020 songs
2020 singles
Big Loud singles
MacKenzie Porter songs
Songs about alcohol
Songs written by Griffen Palmer
Song recordings produced by Joey Moi